Enzo Sereni (17 April 190518 November 1944) was an Italian Socialist Zionist, co-founder of kibbutz Givat Brenner, celebrated intellectual, advocate of Jewish-Arab co-existence and a Jewish Brigade officer who was parachuted into Nazi-occupied Italy in World War II, captured by the Germans and executed in Dachau concentration camp.

Early life
Sereni was born in Rome. His father was physician to the King of Italy. He grew up in a traditional Jewish Italian household but became a Zionist as a teenager and was one of the first Italian Zionists.

Zionist activity
After obtaining his PhD in philosophy from the University of Rome, he emigrated to Mandate Palestine in 1927. He worked in orange groves in Rehovot and soon helped found kibbutz Givat Brenner. As an enthusiastic socialist, Sereni was also active in the Histadrut trade union. He was a pacifist who advocated co-existence with the Arabs and integration of Jewish and Arab society.

Sereni was sent to Europe in 1931–1934 to help bring people to Palestine through the Youth Aliyah, and was arrested briefly by the Gestapo. He helped to organize the Hechalutz movement in Nazi Germany and was also involved in helping to smuggle money and people out of Germany. Sereni was also sent to the United States to help organize the Zionist movement there.

During World War II, he joined the British Army, and was involved in disseminating anti-fascist propaganda in Egypt. The British sent him to Iraq, and Sereni spent part of his time organizing clandestine aliyah. In 1942, Sereni became one of the first Jewish emissaries from Palestine to Iraq and visited Sandur, a Jewish village in northern Iraq and described it in detail. The village was located an hour and a half's drive from Mosul, in a valley between two walls of rock. It was completely green and "full of gardens of fruit, pears, grapes, plums, pomegranates, apples". Sereni got in trouble with his British superior officers for his Zionist views and was imprisoned briefly for forging passports.

Sereni then helped organize the Jewish parachute unit of the British Special Operations Executive (SOE) that sent agents into occupied Europe. Of about 250 volunteer trainees, about 110 were selected for training, and 33 were actually parachuted into Europe, including Sereni, despite his relatively advanced age. On 15 May 1944, he was parachuted into Northern Italy but was captured immediately. According to records, he was shot in Dachau concentration camp on 18 November 1944. Other famous martyrs who parachuted into Europe with this unit include Hannah Szenes and Haviva Reik. Kibbutz Netzer Sereni is named after him, as are many streets throughout Israel.

Sereni wrote several books and numerous articles.

References

External links
Biography of Enzo Sereni; at JewishVirtualLibrary.org 
Zionist Parachutists (in World War II); at zionism-israel.com

1905 births
1944 deaths
British Army personnel of World War II
Special Operations Executive personnel killed in World War II
Spies who died in Nazi concentration camps
Italian Jews who died in the Holocaust
Italian Zionists
Kibbutzniks
Executed spies
Italian people who died in Dachau concentration camp
Mandatory Palestine military personnel of World War II
Jewish military personnel